Leila is a feminine given name primarily in the Semitic (Arabic, Hebrew) and Iranian languages. In Latin alphabet the name is commonly spelled in multiple ways, including Laela, Laelah, Laila, Layla, Laylah, Leila, Leilah, Leela, Leighla, Lejla, Leyla and Leylah.

In Hebrew and 
Arabic the word Leila or Laila means "night", "dark" and the name is often given to girls born during the night, signifying "daughter of the night".

The story of Qays and Layla or Layla and Majnun is based on the romantic poems of Qais Ibn Al-Mulawwah in 7th century Arabia, who was nicknamed Majnoon Layla, Arabic for "madly in love with Layla", referring to his cousin Layla Al-Amiriah. His poems are considered the paragon of unrequited chaste love. They later became a popular romance in medieval Iran, and use of the name spread accordingly. The name gained popularity further afield in the Persianate world, amongst Turkic peoples and in the Balkans and India.

In the Nordic countries, Laila or Lajla is derived from the Sami name Láilá, the Sami variant of Helga which means "holy".

People with this name

Laila
Laila Akhmetova, Kazakh doctor of historical sciences
Laila Ali, boxer and daughter of Muhammad Ali
Laila Ali Abdulla, First Lady of the Maldives
Laila Bagge, Swedish manager and songwriter
Laila Bērziņa (born 1965), Latvian politician
Laila Bjurling (born 1947), Swedish politician
Laila Freivalds, Swedish Social-Democrat
Laila Harré, New Zealand politician
Laila Hirvisaari, Finnish author and writer
Laila El Khalifi (better known as Leila K), Swedish singer and rapper
Laila Kinnunen, Finnish singer
Laila Lalami, Moroccan-American novelist and essayist
Laila Mehdin, Indian actress
Laila Morse, English actress
Laila Pakalniņa, Latvian director
Laila Rouass, English actress
Laila Soueif, Egyptian human and women's rights activist
Laila Stien, Norwegian writer
Laila Wasti, Pakistani actress and director
Laila Woozeer, British author and activist
DJ Laila, Filipino radio and television presenter

Layla
Layla al-Akhyaliyya, 8th century AD Umayyad Arab poet
Layla Balabakki (born 1936), Lebanese writer and activist
Layla El (born 1977), British wrestler, dancer, model, actress, and entrepreneur
Layla Handbury (born 1982), Australian MC
Layla Iskandar (born 2002), Lebanese footballer
Layla Kayleigh (born 1986), G4 host on the US television program, Attack of the Show!
Layla Kaylif (born 1971), British Emirati singer
Layla McCarter (born 1979), American boxer
Layla Moran (born 1982), British Liberal Democrat politician
Layla Palmer, singer and keyboardist for the band Amity Lane
Layla Taj, Egyptian dancer

Leila
Leila Aboulela, Sudanese writer
Leila Ahmed, Egyptian-American professor
Leila Anderson, South African performance artist
Leïla Ben Ali, Tunisian political figure
Leila Arab, London-based musician of Persian descent
Leila Barros, Brazilian volleyball player
Leila Bela, Iranian-American  musician, actress and writer
Leïla Chaibi, French politician
Leila de Lima, Filipino human rights activist
Leila Denmark, American pediatrician
Leila Esfandyari (19712011), Iranian mountain climber
Leila Forouhar, Iranian singer and actress
Leila Ben-Gacem, Tunisian social entrepreneur
Leila Goldkuhl, American model, contestant on America's Next Top Model, Cycle 19
Leila Hatami, Iranian actress
Leila Hayes, Australian actress
Leila Hyams, American film actress
Leïla Jaffel, Tunisian politician and jurist
Leila Josefowicz, American violinist
Leila K (born Laila El Khalifi), Swedish singer and rapper
Leila Kasra, Iranian poet and lyricist
Leila Khaled, Palestinian hijacker and PFLP member
Leila Lopes (pageant titleholder), Miss Universe 2011 from Angola
Leila Luik (born 1985), Estonian long-distance runner
Leila Mardanshina, Soviet and Russian gas and oil operator
Leila McKinnon, Iranian-Australian journalist
Lelia N. Morris (18621929), American hymnwriter
Leila Mourad, Egyptian singer and movie star
Leila Movarekhi, Iranian Princess of Qajar dynasty
Leila Pahlavi, Princess of Iran
Leila Säälik (born 1941), Estonian actress
Leïla Slimani (born 1981), French-Moroccan writer and journalist
Leila Sobral, Brazilian basketball player
Leila Al Solh, Lebanese public figure
Leila Tong, Hong Kong actress and singer
Leila Vaziri, Iranian-American swimmer, world record holder
Leila Waddell, mistress of British occultist Aleister Crowley

Leilah
Leilah Assunção, British dramatist, actress and writer
Leilah Mahi (1890–1932), French writer
Leilah Nadir, Canadian writer
Leilah Weinraub (born 1979), American filmmaker and conceptual artist

Lejla
Lejla Agolli (born 1950), Albanian composer
Lejla Basic (born 1994), Swedish footballer 
Lejla Hot (born 1986), Serbian pop singer, musician, and songwriter
Lejla Kalamujić, queer writer from Bosnia and Herzegovina
Lejla Tanović (born 1994), Bosnian mountain bike racer

Leyla
Leyla Achba, princess at the Ottoman Empire court
Leyla Bağcı (born 1990), Turkish-Dutch footballer
Leyla Chihuán, Peruvian volleyball player
Leyla Gencer, Turkish soprano opera singer
Leyla Güngör (born 1993), Turkish-Swedish footballer
Leyla Mamedbekova, Azerbaijani pathologist
Leyla Mammadbeyova, the first female Azerbaijani aviator
Leyla Milani, Canadian model of Iranian descent
Leyla Neyzi, Turkish academic
Leyla Pınar, Turkish harpsichordist and musicologist
Leyla Qasim, Kurdish activist in Iraq
Leyla Saz, composer, poet and writer of Cretan Turkish descent
Leyla Soleymani, Canadian scientist
Leyla Tuğutlu, Turkish beauty queen
Leyla Vakilova, Azerbaijani ballerina
Leyla Zana, Kurdish politician from Turkey

Leylah
Leylah Alliët (born 1991), Belgian beauty pageant titleholder 
Leylah Fernandez (born 2002), Canadian tennis player

Film, music and literature
 Laila, Norwegian silent film starring Mona Mårtenson
Laila (album), album by Shahin Badar
Layla, song by Derek and the Dominos
 Leila, song by Indochine in the album L'aventurier
 Leila, song by Miami Horror in the EP The Shapes
"Leila," an essay by Margaret Fuller
"Lejla", a song by Hari Mata Hari, Bosnia and Herzegovina's entry in the Eurovision Song Contest 2006 (3rd place)

Fictional and mythological characters
Lailah, an angel of the night in Jewish mythology
Layla in the classic Arabic love story Layla and Majnun
Leïla, heroine of Bizet's opera Les Pecheurs de Perles (The Pearl Fishers), 1863
Layla in the 1st Story Maxi CD 「Seisen no Iberia / 聖戦のイベリア」 of Sound Horizon
Layla in the animated series Winx Club
Layla Hamilton in the Japanese manga series Kaleido Star
Layla Heartfilia in the Japanese manga series Fairy Tail
Leyla Harding in the British soap opera Emmerdale
Layla Miller in the Marvel universe
Layla, from series 3-5 of The Story of Tracy Beaker, portrayed by Cara Readle
Layla Serizawa in the Japanese manga series NANA
Layla in the Japanese manga Black Butler/Kuroshitsuji, first introduced in chapter 172
Layla, a playable Cryo character in Genshin Impact
Leela (Doctor Who), a companion of the Fourth Doctor (1977–78)
Leela Lomax, a character in soap opera Hollyoaks
Leela in the animated TV show Futurama
Leila, a playable character in Final Fantasy II
Layla Prismriver, a character briefly mentioned in the Japanese doujin game series (shoot 'em up) Touhou Project
Leila, a daughter of main character in video game by Saber Interactive Inversion
Leila Hosnani, mother of Nessim (and Narouz) Hosnani, in Lawrence Durrell's The Alexandria Quartet
Leila Kwan Zimmer, a character in the Netflix series  Grand Army
Lilah Morgan in Angel (1999 TV series) TV show
Leila Dalton, protagonist of the Night Prince novels by Jeaniene Frost
Laila, character portrayed by Sunny Leone in item song "Laila Main Laila" from Raees
Layla M. Luzhkova in the Japanese anime series Sakura Wars the Animation
Lyla Garrity in the television series Friday Night Lights
Layla Hassan, character in Assassin's Creed video game series
Layla El-Faouly / Scarlet Scarab in the Marvel Cinematic Universe TV show Moon Knight
Laila Lewin in the book series The Wheel of Time
Leyla Sancak in The Protector (Turkish TV series)

See also

Leela (name)
Leila (disambiguation)
Lilith, name with the same etymological root

Notes

References

Arabic feminine given names
English feminine given names
Estonian feminine given names
Hebrew feminine given names
Iranian feminine given names

de:Laila
fr:Leila
fi:Laila
sv:Laila